Peptidyl-prolyl cis-trans isomerase G is an enzyme that in humans is encoded by the PPIG gene.

Interactions
PPIG (gene) has been shown to interact with Pinin.

References

Further reading

External links